Gerod Holliman (born May 6, 1994) is an American football safety who is currently a free agent. At the University of Louisville, he won the Jim Thorpe Award as the nation's top defensive back in college football.  He set an NCAA record for most interceptions (14) in a season. He was drafted by the Pittsburgh Steelers in the seventh round of the 2015 NFL Draft. He played college football at Louisville. Holliman has also been a member of the Tampa Bay Buccaneers.

Early years
Holliman attended Miami Southridge High School in Miami, Florida, where he played football mainly as a safety. As a senior, he led Dade County with 12 interceptions, returning five for touchdowns. In a game vs. Coral Reef, he recorded an 80-yard kickoff return for a touchdown, a 38-yard interception return for a score, caught six passes for 78 yards and rushed six times for 118 yards, including a 70-yard touchdown run. In track & field, Holliman posted personal-best times of 23.5 seconds in the 200-meter dash and 53.84 seconds in the 400-meter dash as a senior.

After high school, Holliman attended Milford Academy for a year.

Recruiting
Regarded as a four-star recruit by Rivals.com, Holliman was ranked as the second best safety in his class. He was ranked as a four-star prospect and the No. 10 safety according to Scout.com. He was considered one of the hardest hitters in the state of Florida, and was ranked 49th on ESPN.com's Top 150 and was viewed as the third-ranked safety. He was rated by 247Sports.com as the 107th-best prospect, the sixth-best safety and the 21st-ranked player in the state. He also ranked 193rd on Tom Lemming's list. Described as a safety prospect who seems to always be around the ball, great at diagnosing the run plays versus passes and quick to come up and hit a running back, he originally committed to the University of Mississippi to play college football, but changed it to the University of Louisville. He also received scholarship offers from Cincinnati, Miami, West Virginia, Tennessee and Nebraska, among others.

College career
As a true freshman at Louisville in 2012, Holliman played in only three games due to a shoulder injury. As a redshirt freshman in 2013, he played in 11 games with two starts and recorded 16 tackles. Holliman became a first year starter as a redshirt sophomore in 2014. He finished the season with an NCAA record-tying 14 interceptions. He won the Jim Thorpe Award and was named a consensus All-American.

After his junior season, Holliman entered the 2015 NFL Draft.

Professional career

Pittsburgh Steelers
Holliman was selected by the Pittsburgh Steelers in the seventh round of the 2015 NFL Draft. He was released on September 5, 2015.

Tampa Bay Buccaneers
Holliman was signed to the Tampa Bay Buccaneers' practice squad on December 30, 2015. He signed a reserve/future contract with the team on January 5, 2016. He was released by the Buccaneers on April 29, 2016.

Columbus Lions
On August 15, 2017, Holliman signed with the Columbus Lions for the 2018 season.

Bismarck Bucks
On May 4, 2022, Holliman signed with the Bismarck Bucks of the Indoor Football League (IFL). On June 15, 2022, Holliman was put on the RTR list by the Bucks. In turn, making him a free agent.

References

External links
Louisville Cardinals bio

1994 births
Living people
Miami Southridge Senior High School alumni
Players of American football from Miami
American football safeties
Louisville Cardinals football players
All-American college football players
Pittsburgh Steelers players
Columbus Lions players